Róbert Élő (born 17 October 1969) is a Hungarian gymnast. He competed in eight events at the 1992 Summer Olympics.

References

1969 births
Living people
Hungarian male artistic gymnasts
Olympic gymnasts of Hungary
Gymnasts at the 1992 Summer Olympics
Sportspeople from Győr